Camilla Kvartoft (born 6 March 1968) is a Swedish television presenter and journalist. She hosted the SVT crime show Veckans Brott between 2010-2018. Kvartoft was born in Hägersten, Sweden. Kvartoft has also presented the political debates between the party leaders on SVT.

References

Living people
1968 births
Swedish television hosts
Swedish women television presenters
Journalists from Stockholm